Sins of the Parents (German: Sünden der Eltern) is a 1919 German silent film directed by Richard Eichberg and starring Lee Parry, Bruno Decarli and Violetta Napierska.

The film's sets were designed by the art director Willi Herrmann.

Cast
 Lee Parry 
 Bruno Decarli as Portierssohn Karlemann 
 Violetta Napierska as Bankierstochter Jutta Sternheim 
 Rudolf Klein-Rhoden
 Carl Gerhard Schröder
 Frau Thumser-Einödshofer
 Karl Halden
 Edmund Löwe
 Emil Rameau
 Trude Kurtze
 Frau Lehndorf-Schöttle
 Felix Hecht

References

Bibliography
 Alfred Krautz. International directory of cinematographers, set- and costume designers in film, Volume 4. Saur, 1984.

External links

1919 films
Films of the Weimar Republic
Films directed by Richard Eichberg
German silent feature films
German black-and-white films
1910s German films